Xerocrassa is a genus of small, air-breathing land snails, terrestrial pulmonate gastropod molluscs in the family Geomitridae. 

Some species of Xerocrassa are instead considered to belong to the subgenus Xerocrassa, within the genus Trochoidea; in those cases the species are listed under the generic name Trochoidea. However, for other authors both taxa are not closely related being different genera.

Taxonomy 
The genus Xerocrassa is divided in 3 subgenera:

 Xerocrassa (Amandana) Fagot, 1891
 Xerocrassa (Xeroclausa) Monterosato, 1892
 Xerocrassa (Xerocrassa) Monterosato, 1892

Species 

Species in the genus Xerocrassa:
 
 Xerocrassa amphiconus (Maltzan, 1883)
 Xerocrassa arturi (Haas, 1924)
 Xerocrassa barceloi (Hidalgo, 1878)
 Xerocrassa berenice (Kobelt, 1883)
 Xerocrassa cardonae (Hidalgo, 1867)
 Xerocrassa carinatoglobosa (F. Haas, 1934)
 Xerocrassa caroli (Dohrn & Heynemann, 1862)
 Xerocrassa chiae (Fagot, 1886)
 Xerocrassa cisternasi (Hidalgo, 1883)
 Xerocrassa claudia (Hausdorf & Welter-Schultes, 1998)
 Xerocrassa claudiconus (Hausdorf & Welter-Schultes, 1998)
 Xerocrassa cobosi (Ortiz de Zárate López, 1962)
 Xerocrassa commeata (Mousson, 1874)
 Xerocrassa cretica (Férussac, 1821)
 Xerocrassa davidiana (Bourguignat, 1863)
 Xerocrassa derogata (Rossmässler, 1854)
 Xerocrassa diensis (Maltzan, 1883)
 Xerocrassa ebusitana (Hidalgo, 1869)
 Xerocrassa edmundi (Martínez-Ortí, 2006)
 Xerocrassa elevata (Pallary, 1924)>
 Xerocrassa eremophila (L. Pfeiffer, 1853)
 Xerocrassa erkelii (Kobelt, 1878)
 Xerocrassa ferreri (Jaeckel, 1952)
 Xerocrassa fourtaui (Pallary, 1902)
 Xerocrassa franciscoi (Hausdorf & Sauer, 2009)
 Xerocrassa frater (Dohrn & Heynemann, 1862)
 Xerocrassa geyeri (Soós, 1926)
 Xerocrassa gharlapsi (Beckmann, 1987)
 Xerocrassa grabusana (Hausdorf & Sauer, 2009)
 Xerocrassa grata (Haas, 1924)
 Xerocrassa helleri (Forcart, 1976)
 Xerocrassa heraklea (Hausdorf & Sauer, 2009)
 Xerocrassa homeyeri (Dohrn & Heynemann, 1862)
 Xerocrassa huggani R. Brandt, 1959
 Xerocrassa jimenensis (Puente & Arrébola, 1996)
 Xerocrassa kydonia (Hausdorf & Sauer, 2009)
 Xerocrassa lacertara (Bourguignat, 1863)
 Xerocrassa lacipensis Torres Alba & Quintana Cardona, 2021
 Xerocrassa langloisiana (Bourguignat, 1853)
 Xerocrassa lasithiensis (Hausdorf & Sauer, 2009)
 Xerocrassa latastei (Letourneux in Letourneux & Bourguignat, 1887)
 Xerocrassa latasteopsis (Letourneux & Bourguignat, 1887)
 Xerocrassa libyca (Kobelt, 1883)
 Xerocrassa meda (Porro, 1840)
 Xerocrassa mesostena (Westerlund, 1879)
 Xerocrassa mienisi (Forcart, 1976)
 Xerocrassa molinae (Hidalgo, 1883)
 Xerocrassa montserratensis (Hidalgo, 1870)
 Xerocrassa moraguesi (Kobelt, 1883)
 Xerocrassa naisi (Pallary, 1939)
 Xerocrassa nicosiana (Gittenberger, 1991)
 Xerocrassa nyeli (Mittre, 1842)
 Xerocrassa pallaresica (Fagot, 1886)
 Xerocrassa penalveri Martinez-Orti, 2022
 Xerocrassa penchinati (Bourguignat, 1868)
 Xerocrassa picardi (F. Haas, 1933)
 Xerocrassa pilsbryi Forcart, 1976
 Xerocrassa poecilodoma (Boettger, 1894)
 Xerocrassa prietoi (Hidalgo, 1878)
 Xerocrassa pseudojacosta (Forcart, 1976)
 Xerocrassa rhabdota (Sturany, 1901)
 Xerocrassa rhithymna (Hausdorf & Sauer, 2009)
 Xerocrassa ripacurcica (Bofill, 1886)
 Xerocrassa roblesi (Martínez-Ortí, 2000)
 Xerocrassa salvanae (Fagot, 1886)
 Xerocrassa seetzeni (Pfeiffer, 1847) - the type species
 Xerocrassa siderensis (Maltzan, 1883)
 Xerocrassa simulata (Ehrenberg, 1831)
 Xerocrassa sinaica (E. von Martens, 1889)
 Xerocrassa siphnica (Kobelt, 1883)
 Xerocrassa subrogata (Pfeiffer, 1853)
 Xerocrassa subvariegata (Maltzan, 1883)
 Xerocrassa tuberculosa (Conrad, 1852)
 Xerocrassa turolensis (Ortiz de Zárate, 1963)
 Xerocrassa zaharensis (Puente & Arrébola, 1996)
 Xerocrassa zilchi (Forcart, 1976)
 Xerocrassa zviae Mienis, 2017

Synonyms
 Xerocrassa betulonensis (Bofill, 1898 ): synonym of Xerocrassa montserratensis (Hidalgo, 1870)
 Xerocrassa claudinae (Gasull, 1964): synonym of Xerocrassa moraguesi (Kobelt, 1883)
Xerocrassa formenterensis Schröder, 1984: synonym of Xerocrassa caroli formenterensis (F. Schröder, 1984)
 Xerocrassa muehlfeldtiana (Rossmässler, 1837): synonym of Helicopsis striata (O. F. Müller, 1774)
 Xerocrassa ponsi (Hidalgo, 1878): synonym of Xerocrassa nyeli ponsi (Hidalgo, 1878)

See also 
 Trochoidea

References

External links 

 Sauer J. & Hausdorf B. (2010). "Reconstructing the evolutionary history of the radiation of the land snail genus Xerocrassa on Crete based on mitochondrial sequences and AFLP markers". BMC Evolutionary Biology 10: 299. .

 
Geomitridae